Shukburgh or Shuckburgh Ashby (6 October 1724 – 28 January 1792) was a British landowner and politician.

Life
Ashby was the eldest son of Shukburgh Ashby, Leicestershire and was educated at Balliol College, Oxford. He inherited the Quenby estate from his great-uncle in 1728.

He was elected a Fellow of the Royal Society in 1756.

He was appointed High Sheriff of Leicestershire for 1758–59 and became Member of Parliament for Leicester at a by-election in February 1784 following the death of the sitting MP John Darker. He declined to stand for re-election in the General Election later that year.

He married Elizabeth, the daughter and heiress of Richard Hinde of Cold Ashby, Northamptonshire, with whom he had two daughters.

He is buried in St John the Baptist churchyard, Hungarton, Leicestershire with a monument by Thomas Banks.

References
 

1724 births
1792 deaths
People from Harborough District
Alumni of Balliol College, Oxford
Members of the Parliament of Great Britain for English constituencies
British MPs 1780–1784
Fellows of the Royal Society